Clinton High School, or CHS, is a public high school in the village of Clinton, Oneida County, New York, United States. All of the Clinton Central School District buildings are at the same location, and the middle school is attached to the high school, as are the district offices. The high school harbors four grades, 9th, 10th, 11th, and 12th. For the past five years, the school has gone through many renovations and expansions. School classes begin the first Thursday after Labor Day, and continue until June. The school year consists of 180 school days. The most recent school budget proposal, which requested $22.8 million for 2007-08, was rejected in May 2007 by 38 votes (677-639).

History
Clinton High School succeeded under the institutions of their boss, the superintendent. In 1989, the two buildings were attached by several classrooms and a hallway, commonly known as 'the Bridge'. In 1996, the school's library was constructed. The 'Media Center' contains over 1,000 books and 30 computers. In 2003, another expansion was completed. The science wing added 8 new classrooms and facilities specially designed for Biology, Earth Science, Chemistry, and Physics. At the beginning of the 2004-2005 school year, the high school opened a new  gymnasium complex. Several other athletic facilities were constructed along with it, as well as a large lobby used for the district's annual craft fair.

Academics
Clinton High School regularly makes Newsweek's list of the top 1200 high schools.

Extra-curricular Activities

The school offers and competes competitively in a number of sports, including soccer, golf, bowling, lacrosse, tennis, volleyball, basketball, Track and Field, cross country, pelota, American football, field hockey, and ice hockey.

References

Public high schools in New York (state)
Schools in Oneida County, New York
Clinton (village), New York